Gavril Iliev Katsarov was a Bulgarian historian, classical philologist and archeologist. Rector of Sofia University. Director of the National Archaeological Museum and the Bulgarian Archeological Institute.

Adopted as the father of Bulgarian Thracology.

In 1899 he graduated with a doctorate in Classical Philology and Ancient History from the University of Leipzig. He specialized at the University of Berlin and the University of Munich (1901-1902), followed by Italy (1906).

Full member (academician) of the Bulgarian Academy of Sciences, (1909). Member of the Romanian Academy of Sciences (1936) and the Austrian Academy of Sciences (1939). Member of foreign companies and institutes.

Selected publications 
 The Athenian State System (1904).
 Contribution to the Ancient History of Sofia (1910).
 
 Sources for the Old History and Geography of Thrace and Macedonia (1915).
 Contributions to the History of Antiquity (1920).
 Paeonia: Contribution to the Ancient Ethnography and History of Macedonia (1921).
 King Philip II of Macedon: History of Macedonia until 336 BC (1922).
 Bulgaria in Antiquity: Historical and Archaeological Essay (1926).
 General and Bulgarian History for the Junior High School Course (1927).
 
 Sources for the Ancient History and Geography of Thrace and Macedonia (1949).

Notes

External Sources 
Works by Gavril Katsarov in libraries (WorldCat Catalog).

1874 births
1958 deaths
20th-century Bulgarian historians
Bulgarian archaeologists
Bulgarian philologists
Thracologists
Leipzig University alumni
Rectors of Sofia University
Members of the Bulgarian Academy of Sciences
People from Koprivshtitsa
Burials at Central Sofia Cemetery